A list of windmills in the Belgian province of East Flanders.

Notes
Bold indicates a mill that is still standing. Italics indicates a mill with some remains surviving.

Buildings and structures in East Flanders
Tourist attractions in East Flanders
East Flanders